Midnapore Homoeopathic Medical College and Hospital (MHMC&H) is a homeopathic medical college and hospital in Midnapore, West Bengal, India. This college was established on 3 December 1945. It is one of the oldest running homeopathic institutions in India. It offers the Bachelor of Homeopathic Medicine and Surgery (BHMS) degree course. The college is recognized by the Central Council of Homoeopathy (CCH), Ministry of Ayush and affiliated with the West Bengal University of Health Sciences.

See also
Midnapore Medical College and Hospital
List of hospitals in India

References

External links
Official Website

1945 establishments in India
Educational institutions established in 1945
Homeopathic hospitals
Hospitals established in 1945
Hospitals in West Bengal
Universities and colleges in Paschim Medinipur district
Homoeopathic Medical Colleges in West Bengal
Affiliates of West Bengal University of Health Sciences